The following is a list of episodes from Hanna-Barbera's Secret Squirrel.

Series overview
{| class="wikitable" style="text-align:center"
! colspan=2 rowspan=2| Season
! rowspan=2| Episodes
! colspan=2| Originally aired
|-
! Season premiere
! Season finale
|-
| style="width:5px; background:#B11030"|
| 1
| 20
| 
|  
|-
| bgcolor="0000A0"|
| 2
| 6
| 
|  
|-
|  ! style="background:#700070"|
| Super Secret Secret Squirrel
| 13
| 
| 
|}

Episodes

Season 1 (1965–66)

Season 2 (1966)

Super Secret Secret Squirrel (1993)

References

 tvguide.com Episode List
 tv.com Episode List

Lists of American children's animated television series episodes